Brian Kennedy (Brian O'Cinnéide) is a Gaelic footballer who plays for the Derrylaughan Kevin Barrys GAC club and the Tyrone county team. Born on the 31st March 1998

Honours
Tyrone
 All-Ireland Senior Football Championship (1): 2021
 Ulster Senior Football Championship (1): 2021

Individual 
 All Star Award (1): 2021

References

Living people
Tyrone inter-county Gaelic footballers
1998 births